This article lists political parties in Gibraltar.

Current parties

Active Gibraltarian parties

Active British parties
 The British Conservative Party (local branch). A branch of the UK South West region party, which contested European Elections, where Gibraltar was part of the South West England constituency.
 UKIP Gibraltar - A branch of the UK Independence Party set up to promote UKIP in the European Elections and originally was to contest the 2015 General Election in Gibraltar

Defunct parties

See also

 Lists of political parties

References

External links
 Gibraltar Social Democrats
 Gibraltar Socialist Labour Party
 Liberal Party
 The Conservative Party in Gibraltar
 Progressive Democratic Party

 
Gibraltar
Gibraltar
Political parties